Timothy K. Lewis (born 1954 in Pittsburgh, Pennsylvania), is a former United States circuit judge of the United States Court of Appeals for the Third Circuit and is currently  an attorney at the law firm of Schnader, Harrison, Segal & Lewis LLP, where he serves as the co-chair of the firm's alternative dispute resolution group. He also serves as a mediator, arbitrator, settlement counselor. Lewis is African American.

Education and career

Lewis graduated from Tufts University with a Bachelor of Arts degree in 1976 and from Duquesne University School of Law with a Juris Doctor in 1980. He worked as an assistant district attorney for Allegheny County, Pennsylvania from 1980 to 1983, and as an Assistant United States Attorney for the Western District of Pennsylvania from 1983 to 1991. He is the great-great-great-grandson of Lewis Woodson, believed to be the grandson of Thomas Jefferson and his alleged mixed-raced slave, Sally Hemings, with DNA evidence in 1998 suggesting this was true.

Federal judicial service

Lewis' judicial career began on April 25, 1991, when President George H. W. Bush nominated him to the bench of the United States District Court for the Western District of Pennsylvania, to fill the vacancy left by Paul A. Simmons.  He was confirmed by the Senate on June 14, 1991, and received his commission on June 18, 1991. His service terminated on October 23, 1992, due to elevation to the Third Circuit.

President Bush chose to elevate Lewis again when he nominated him for a newly created seat on the United States Court of Appeals for the Third Circuit on September 17, 1992.  He was confirmed to this seat by the Senate on October 8, 1992. He received his commission on October 9, 1992, making him the final George H. W. Bush appeals-court nominee confirmed by the Senate. At the time of both appointments, he was the youngest federal judge in the United States. On June 30, 1999, Lewis resigned his seat to return to private practice.

Later career

Since resigning from the bench, Lewis has worked at Schnader, Harrison, Segal & Lewis LLP, where he serves as co-chair of the firm's alternative dispute resolution group and often serves as a mediator, arbitrator, and settlement counselor. Lewis also serves as counsel on trial and appellate matters and is a past co-chair of Schnader's appellate practice group.

Lewis has formerly held several positions with the American Arbitration Association, including as a member of the Judicial Settlement Conference Service Panel, a member of the National Task Force on Issues Related to the Arbitration of Consumer Debt Issues, and as a board and executive committee member. At the International Institute for Conflict Prevention and Resolution (CPR), he served on the Task Force that created the Employment-Related Mass Claims Protocol for arbitrators and mediators, is co-chair of the Diversity in ADR Task Force, and is a former member of the board of directors. Lewis is a member of the American Law Institute, an honorary fellow of the American Academy of Appellate Lawyers, a fellow of the College of Commercial Arbitrators, an active member of the Pennsylvania Interbranch Commission for Gender, Racial, and Ethnic Fairness, and serves on the Board of Advisors of the Georgetown Supreme Court Institute. He is a former member of the board of directors of the National Jazz Museum in Harlem.

See also 
 List of African-American federal judges
 List of African-American jurists

References

External links

Attorney bio from Schnader, Harrison, Segal & Lewis

1954 births
Living people
20th-century American judges
African-American judges
African-American lawyers
American prosecutors
Assistant United States Attorneys
Constitution Project
Duquesne University alumni
Judges of the United States Court of Appeals for the Third Circuit
Judges of the United States District Court for the Western District of Pennsylvania
Lawyers from Pittsburgh
Pennsylvania lawyers
Tufts University alumni
United States court of appeals judges appointed by George H. W. Bush
United States district court judges appointed by George H. W. Bush